Africa Spectrum (also formerly known as Afrika Spectrum) is an interdisciplinary peer-reviewed academic journal concentrating on current development issues in Africa south of the Sahara. It is the only German academic journal exclusively devoted to Africa and is Platinum Open Access. Africa Spectrum is published three times a year by the GIGA Institute of African Affairs and was founded in 1966. The journal is part of the GIGA Journal Family of the GIGA-Institute of African Affairs (Deutsches Institut für Afrika-Forschung/Institute of African Studies (Hamburg) within the German Institute for Global and Area Studies at (Hamburg, Germany). Issues starting from the year 1966 are available at JSTOR, with a three-year moving wall.

Concept 
Africa Spectrum focuses on social science dealing with Africa (African Studies) and aims at academics, students and general readers and practitioners with a concern for contemporary Africa. Since 2003 the journal collaborates closely with the Association of Africanists in Germany (Vereinigung für Afrikawissenschaften in Deutschland, VAD).

Indexing
The journal is indexed by the Social Sciences Citation Index, African Studies Abstracts Online, Cambridge Scientific Abstracts, Scopus, and the International Bibliography of the Social Sciences.

References

External links
 
 
 

African studies journals
Open access journals
Development studies journals
Triannual journals